Judy in Love is a 1958 studio album by Judy Garland, arranged by Nelson Riddle.

Track listing
 "Zing! Went the Strings of My Heart" (James F. Hanley) – 3:39
 "I Can't Give You Anything but Love, Baby" (Dorothy Fields, Jimmy McHugh) – 4:39
 "This Is It" (Fields, Arthur Schwartz) – 2:18
 "More Than You Know" (Edward Eliscu, Billy Rose, Vincent Youmans) – 3:19
 "I Am Loved" (Cole Porter) – 3:14
 "I Hadn't Anyone Till You" (Ray Noble) – 3:32
 "I Concentrate on You" (Porter) – 3:22
 "(I'm) Confessin' (That I Love You)" (Doc Daugherty, Al J. Neiburg, Ellis Reynolds) – 2:44
 "Do I Love You?" (Porter) – 3:15
 "Do It Again" (Buddy DeSylva, George Gershwin) – 2:38
 "Day In, Day Out" (Rube Bloom, Johnny Mercer) – 3:54

Personnel

Performance
Judy Garland - vocals
Nelson Riddle - conductor, arranger

References

1958 albums
Judy Garland albums
Albums produced by Voyle Gilmore
Capitol Records albums
Albums arranged by Nelson Riddle
Albums conducted by Nelson Riddle